The New England PGA Championship is a golf tournament that is the championship of the New England section of the PGA of America. The New England section encompasses the states of Maine, Massachusetts, New Hampshire, Rhode Island and Vermont (The other New England state (Connecticut) has its own PGA Section).  It has been played annually since 1921 at a variety of courses in those states.

Winners

 2022 Liam Friedman
 2021 Rich Berberian, Jr.
 2020 Shawn Warren
 2019 Shawn Warren
 2018 Rich Berberian, Jr.
 2017 Liam Friedman
 2016 Matt Doyle
 2015 Rich Berberian, Jr.
 2014 Rich Berberian, Jr.
 2013 Shawn Warren
 2012 Ed Kirby
 2011 John Hickson
 2010 Scott Spence
 2009 Paul Parajeckas
 2008 Ron Philo
 2007 Evan Belcher
 2006 Frank Dully
 2005 Troy Pare
 2004 Ron Philo
 2003 Kirk Hanefeld
 2002 Chip Johnson
 2001 Kirk Hanefeld
 2000 Kirk Hanefeld
 1999 Mike San Filippo
 1998 Mike Baker
 1997 Webb Heintzelman
 1996 Dana Quigley
 1995 John Hickson
 1994 Heath Wessem
 1993 Dana Quigley
 1992 Joe Staffieri
 1991 Dana Quigley
 1990 Mike San Filippo
 1989 Dana Quigley
 1988 Bob Menne
 1987 Keith Lyford
 1986 Tony Kaloustian
 1985 Dana Quigley
 1984 R. Drue Johnson
 1983 Bruce Dobie
 1982 Joe Carr
 1981 David Marad
 1980 Paul Moran
 1979 Larry Startze
 1978 David Marad
 1977 Tom McGuirk
 1976 Tony Morosco
 1975 Joe Carr
 1974 Charles Volpone
 1973 Ross Coon
 1972 Ross Coon
 1971 Charles Volpone
 1970 Chick Evans
 1969 Bob Menne
 1968 Bill Flynn
 1967 Bob Crowley
 1966 Ross Coon
 1965 Art Harris
 1964 Paddy LeClair
 1963 Bob Crowley
 1962 Bob Crowley
 1961 Bob Crowley
 1960 Tex McReynolds
 1959 Bob Crowley
 1958 Bill Ezinicki
 1957 Phil Friel
 1956 Bill Ezinicki
 1955 Jim Browning
 1954 John Thoren
 1953 George Morrison
 1952 Les Kennedy
 1951 Jerry Gianferante
 1950 Tex McReynolds
 1949 Francis Doyle
 1948 Les Kennedy
 1947 Jerry Gianferante
 1946 Les Kennedy
 1945 Les Kennedy
 1944 Les Kennedy
 1943 Dave Hackney
 1942 Ben Loving
 1941 Harold "Jug" McSpaden
 1940 Harry Nettelbladt
 1939 Harold "Jug" McSpaden
 1938 Harold "Jug" McSpaden
 1937 Bob Crowley
 1936 Jim Fogertey
 1935 Charles Grey
 1934 Dave Hackney
 1933 Henry Bontempo
 1932 Ted Turner
 1931 Charles MacAndrew
 1930 Ted Turner
 1929 Henry Cuici
 1928 John Curley
 1927 George Aulbach
 1926 Dave Hackney
 1925 Herb Lagerblade
 1924 Willie Ogg
 1923 John Cowan
 1922 Gilbert Nicholls
 1921 Gilbert Nicholls

Leo Diegel's 29th and final PGA Tour victory is listed as the 1934 New England PGA. However, the records of the New England PGA do not show him as the winner of that tourney in any year.

References

External links
PGA of America – New England section

PGA of America sectional tournaments
Recurring sporting events established in 1929